Baby Birth is a two-volume manga series written by Sukehiro Tomita and illustrated by Haruhiko Mikimoto.

Story 
Hizuru Oborozuki is a student of the TIAA, a prestigious arts school in Tokyo, and the local ace of ice skating, though she doesn't train much. Takuya Hijo is a young composer who has written a melody for the competition Hizuru's going to take part in.

His music awakens in her a new energy. Takuya reveals that they are the only two descendants of Teous, who in ancient times sealed a race of demons, the "Suspicion", who are now free and back on earth. Through Takuya's music Hizuru transforms into a beautiful warrior, ready to fight to protect the world.

References

External links
 
 Baby Birth on Tokyopop's web site
 Mania.com vol. 1 review
 Mania.com vol. 2 review
 Anime Fringe vol. 1 review

2001 manga
Adventure anime and manga
Fantasy anime and manga
Kodansha manga
Seinen manga
Tokyopop titles